2,4,5-Trimethoxypropiophenone is a natural phenylpropanoid and precursor in the synthesis of α-asarone.

Natural occurrence
2,4,5-Trimethoxypropiophenone is a component of several plant species' essential oils. The chemical has been identified in Piper marginatum, Acorus tatarinowii, and Asarum maximum.

References

O-methylated phenylpropanoids
Aromatic ketones